The 1610s BC was a decade lasting from January 1, 1619 BC to December 31, 1610 BC.

Events and trends

Significant people
 King Tang of Shang of China (1617 BC–1588 BC)

References